Van Zyl's golden mole (Cryptochloris zyli) is a golden mole endemic to the Western Cape Province, South Africa. It is listed as an endangered species due to habitat loss. Golden moles are an ancient group of mammals who live mostly below ground. They have shiny coats of dense fur and a streamlined, formless appearance. They have no visible eyes or ears; in fact, they are blind – the small eyes are covered with hairy skin. The ears are small and are hidden in the animal's fur.

Description
The face has white markings.The dorsal fur is short and dense and is a dark lead-grey colour, the under-layer of fur being pale grey. The underparts are a uniform drab colour. Claws one and two are slightly shorter making a pointed digging tool.

Ecology
It lives in the coastal dune belt and adjacent sandy areas. Usually two young are born, sometimes one. Van Zyl's golden mole eats various invertebrates, as well as legless lizards, which grow to a length of about 20 cm (8"). The young of golden moles are born in a grass-lined cavity in the ground. They usually dig their tunnels just below the ground.

Status
Another specimen was collected at Groenriviermond, approximately  further north along the Namaqualand coast, in 2003. Van Zyl's golden mole is threatened by continued loss of habitat. For example, mining of coastal dunes for alluvial diamonds could lead to habitat degradation. Habitat alteration associated with tourism developments along the west coast could also pose a problem for this species. The International Union for Conservation of Nature now rates this species as "endangered".

References

Endemic fauna of South Africa
Afrosoricida
Mammals of South Africa
Mammals described in 1938